Murali Karthikeyan Muthuraman (born 13 September 1960), better known by his stage name Karthik, is an Indian actor, playback singer and politician who works mainly in Tamil cinema. He is the son of veteran actor R. Muthuraman. In the 1980s and 90s, Karthik was one of the biggest stars in the industry. He was first introduced by Bharathiraja in the Tamil film Alaigal Oivathillai (1981) and became a lead actor in Tamil films by his own. He has also appeared in some Telugu films where he is credited as Murali. Karthik is popularly known as Navarasa Nayagan (multi-talented actor) for his "ability to emote all forms of actions and emotions". He has acted in more than 125 films. He has been the recipient of the Tamil Nadu State Film Awards and the Nandi Award. He won four Filmfare Awards South.

Early life and background 
Karthik was born as Murali Karthikeyan Muthuraman on 13 September 1960 in Chennai to veteran actor R. Muthuraman. He has two sons, Gautham and Ghayn, from his first marriage with Ragini, and another son, Thiran, from his second marriage with Rathi.

Film career

Debut and success (1981–1986)

Karthik was first introduced by Bharathiraja in the film Alaigal Oivathillai (1981). He received the Best New Face Award from the Tamil Nadu Government in 1981. He starred in the Telugu version of the film Seethakoka Chilaka that same year under the stage name Murali. He collaborated with leading film directors such as Mani Ratnam, Bharathiraja, Visu, R. Sundarrajan, Ameerjan, R. V. Udayakumar, Priyadarshan, Fazil, Vikraman, Agathiyan, Sundar C., K. S. Ravikumar, P. Vasu and K. V. Anand.

During the earlier stages of his career, Karthik worked three times with R. V. Udaya Kumar. Later, he formed a partnership with Goundamani in many comedy films. He was also well received by the Tamil audience for his performance in Nallavanukku Nallavan (1984) in a role against Rajinikanth. Karthik during the early to mid 80s did many films, but many of the films until 1986 like Bhagavathipuram Railway Gate (1983), Pei Veedu (1984) and Raja Thanthiram (1984) were typical low budget masala films and failed to make a mark. His onscreen pair with Radha was appreciated in the early 80s. He garnered acclaim for his role in the Telugu thriller Anveshana by Vamsy. His cameo in Mouna Ragam (1986) was very well received by the audience. The film made Karthik an instant heartthrob.
Sylvian Patrick from medium.com writes "Mani Ratnam arguably wrote the best cameo ever in Tamil movie history with Manohar’s character. The total time on the screen for Karthik is around 25 min, but the impact he creates is humungous". This film not only catapulted Karthik to fame but, even he would admit, it made him re-think his choice of films and also instilled confidence and belief that he had what is required as an actor to succeed.

Golden years (1987–1991)

This was a golden period in the career of Karthik, where he acted in numerous performance-oriented films. Vanna Kanavugal (1987) was a super hit. Karthik collaborated with several leading directors and gave several successful films. He acted in the Telugu film Abhinandana (1988) for which he won the Nandi Special Jury Award. He followed with commercial successes like Agni Natchathiram (1988), Varusham Padhinaaru (1989), Idhaya Thamarai (1990), Kizhakku Vaasal (1990) and culminated with the black comedy Gopura Vasalile (1991).

Ups and downs (1992–1995)
This was period when Karthik took considerable risks in choosing scripts. Amaran (1992) was an action film where Karthik plays an orphan who eventually becomes a don. When it released, it performed below expectations; however, the song sung by Karthik became a huge rage: 'Vethala Potta Sokkula', one of the super hit songs that Adithyan tuned was sung by Karthik himself in his signature style very similar to his dialogue delivery. The song is a 'love at first sight' kind and its simplicity and very hummable lyrics is what endeared it to many when it was first released. Nadodi Thendral (1992) was a period film helmed by Bharathiraja. Ponnumani (1993) was a village-based melodrama, which was a super hit at the box office and fetched Karthik his fourth Filmfare award. Karthik also spent a considerable amount of time shooting for a Telugu film co-starring Vijayashanti in Maga Rayudu (1994).  This period also witnessed films like Marumagan (1995), Chakravarthy (1995),  Nandhavana Theru (1995) and an average success Thotta Chinungi (1995).

Breakout and consolidation years (1996–1999)
In 1996 Karthik acted in Kizhakku Mugam. In the same year, he acted in his biggest commercial success: the full-length comedy Sundar C's Ullathai Allitha, alongside Rambha and Goundamani. Due to the success, he collaborated with the director again in another profitable venture, Mettukudi. He went on to win critical acclaim for his role in Gokulathil Seethai. He appeared in K. S. Ravikumar's Pistha (1997), which also won good reviews. Karthik carried on his good streak at the box office in 1998, while also winning accolades for his performances in Vikraman's Unnidathil Ennai Koduthen (1998) (100th film), Cheyyar Ravi's Harichandra (1998) and Selva's Pooveli (1998), and won a Tamil Nadu State Award for Best Actor for the latter. In 1999, he played drama films like Chinna Raja, Nilave Mugam Kaattu, Anandha Poongatre, Suyamvaram and Rojavanam. He acted in medium-budget comedy films, notably in four further Sundar C ventures including the successful blockbuster film, Unakkaga Ellam Unakkaga (1999). His pairing with Rambha was a hit with the audience as the pair provided good hits in the late 1990s.

Downfall begins (2000–2001)
During the early 2000s, Karthik experienced a difficult period as he began to lose his popularity at the box office and new actors began to emerge in the Tamil film industry. He subsequently signed on to appear in several films, which were either dropped, shelved or indefinitely postponed during the period. His career as a lead actor subsequently began to dwindle in the early 2000s, with several of his ventures opening with little publicity or being delayed after financial troubles. Many family films came but nothing different were noticed or not one performance was talked about. Such films include Thai Poranthachu (2000), Sandhitha Velai (2000), Kannan Varuvaan (2000), Kuberan (2000) and  Seenu (2000). Films including Prabhu Nepal's Kadhale Swasam alongside Meena, Sundar C's Kadhal Solla Vandhen with Isha Koppikar and Gowri Manohar's Kashmir with Priyanka Trivedi had audio release events but failed to have a theatrical release.
Likewise, other ventures including Mahesh's Manathil alongside Kausalya, Soundarrajan's Click co-starring Prabhu, and Selva's Kai Korthu Vaa progressed before being halted. Similarly, other projects in the early 2000s, such as Gurudeva with Rimjim, Muthalaam Santhippil with Kausalya again and Enrum Unnai Naesippaen were dropped soon after filming had begun. Potential home productions such as Tension and Avan Appadithaan under his banner Aalamara Films also did not materialise. In 2001, his films were Ullam Kollai Poguthae, Lovely and Azhagana Naatkal.

Years in wilderness (2002–2007)
He starred in an action film, Devan with Vijayakanth and Arun Pandian, followed by Game. During the nadir of 2002, Karthik was signed on by producer Keyaar to make a film titled Enna Peyar Veikalaam directed by Vincent Selva. Despite travelling to Pollachi for the shoot, the actor refused to emerge from his hotel room, and following an extended period of confusion, the film was called off and the Nadigar Sangam began legal proceedings against the actor. He acted in the crime film, Indru (2003). The film was a disaster.

Towards the nadir of 2005, he signed on to appear in a negative role in Sathyaraj's Sivalingam IPS, but the film was shelved. In 2004, Karthik suggested that "his acts and habits" had landed him in trouble and was looking to make a comeback. He subsequently appeared in "comeback" films such as Kusthi (2006) and Kalakkura Chandru (2007), both of which had delayed releases and went unnoticed at the box office. Other ventures that the actor described as "comeback projects", such as Kicha's Unnidathil and Raj Kapoor's Sivalingam IPS, were shelved mid-production. Later in 2006, he revealed that he had quit taking drugs and was keen to make another attempt at returning to the film industry.

Renewal (2010–2013)
Karthik opted to make a comeback into acting in 2010 and chose to appear in supporting rather than leading roles, much like his contemporaries Prabhu and Sathyaraj. He was first seen portraying a caring police officer in Maanja Velu, before winning positive reviews for his small role as a forest guard in Mani Ratnam's Raavanan. He subsequently went on to play roles in P. Vasu's Puli Vesham (2011) and the Telugu film Om 3D (2013), both of which failed at the box office.

Revival and comeback (2015–present)

He acted in a negative role in K. V. Anand's  Anegan, where he appears alongside Dhanush. He acted with Suriya in Thaanaa Serndha Koottam (2018), and his son Gautham Karthik in Mr. Chandramouli (2018). He made a guest appearance with actor Karthi in the film, Dev (2019).

Political career 
Karthik entered politics ahead of the 2006 Tamil Nadu Legislative Assembly election. He joined the All India Forward Bloc and was appointed as the Secretary of the Tamil Nadu state unit of the party. He led the party during its electoral campaign on 24 September 2006. He later started his own party Ahila India Naadalum Makkal Katchi in 2009 before the Lok Sabha Elections. He contested from Virudhunagar constituency and got only 15000 votes. He again started another party named Manitha Urimaigal Kaakkum Katchi on 15 December 2018 at Tirunelveli before Lok saba elections and he expressed his support to AIADMK alliance.

2011 Assembly elections 
Karthik's party tried an alliance with AIADMK for the 2011 Assembly elections, but AIADMK supremo denied tickets for his party. Karthik announced his party will contest alone in 25 to 40 seats after it was not allotted any seat in the AIADMK coalition. Karthik sat on a fast in Madurai demanding Madurai Airport be renamed as Pasumpon Thevar Airport. His party with sizeable Thevar votes in southern Tamil Nadu is believed to eat into the AIADMK votebank. In 2006, former AIADMK minister Nainar Nagendran lost by 2,000 votes in Tirunelveli, where Karthik's party polled more than the margin. Two weeks later, he split from ADMK and announced his party will contest independently in 19 constituencies and support DMK in 213 constituencies.

Awards 
Filmfare Awards South
 1988 – Filmfare Award for Best Actor – Tamil – Agni Natchathiram
 1989 – Filmfare Award for Best Actor – Tamil – Varusham Padhinaaru
 1990 – Filmfare Award for Best Actor – Tamil – Kizhakku Vasal
 1993 – Filmfare Award for Best Actor – Tamil – Ponnumani

Tamil Nadu State Film Awards
 1981 – Best Male Debut Award – Alaigal Oivathillai
 1988 – Special Prize for Best Actor – Agni Natchathiram
 1990 – Tamil Nadu State Film Award for Best Actor – Kizhakku Vasal
 1998 – Special Prize for Best Actor – Pooveli and Unnidathil Ennai Koduthen
 Kalaimamani

Cinema Express Awards
 1998 – Cinema Express Award for Best Actor – Tamil – Unnidathil Ennai Koduthen

Nandi Awards
 1988 – Nandi Special Jury Award – Abhinandana

Personal life

Relationships
He married actress Ragini in 1988, his co-star in the film Solaikuyil and the couple has two sons, actor Gautham Karthik and Ghayn Karthik. Later, he also married Ragini's sister, Rathi in 1992 and the couple have a son, Thiran Karthik.

Filmography

As actor

As singer

References

External links 
 
 Profile of karthik at jointscene

1960 births
Living people
Male actors from Chennai
Indian male playback singers
Indian male voice actors
Tamil male actors
Male actors in Tamil cinema
All India Forward Bloc politicians
Filmfare Awards South winners
Tamil Nadu State Film Awards winners
Male actors in Telugu cinema
Indian male film actors
Nandi Award winners
Indian actor-politicians
20th-century Indian singers
Tamil playback singers
Singers from Chennai
Politicians from Chennai
20th-century Indian male actors
21st-century Indian male actors
21st-century Indian politicians
20th-century Indian male singers